David Rose is a unionist politician in Northern Ireland.

Rose first came to prominence as a member of the Progressive Unionist Party (PUP).  He stood unsuccessfully for the party for North Down Borough Council in the Holywood area at the 2001 local elections, then also failed to be elected for the North Down constituency at the 2003 Northern Ireland Assembly election.  Despite this, he was elected as the party's deputy leader, serving under David Ervine.

In 2010, Rose resigned from the PUP, shortly after its leader, Dawn Purvis, had resigned, and following the murder of Bobby Moffett by the Ulster Volunteer Force, a paramilitary group with links with the party.  In 2013, he played a leading role in the formation of a new unionist party, NI21, and was appointed as its first general secretary.

Rose has also served on a policing board, and has trained political parties in several countries.  Outside politics, he worked as a schoolteacher.

References

Year of birth missing (living people)
Living people
NI21 politicians
Progressive Unionist Party politicians
Schoolteachers from Northern Ireland
Place of birth missing (living people)